HMS Garland was the French privateer Mars, launched in 1798 that   captured in 1800. The Royal Navy took her into service and sent her out to the Jamaica Station. There she had a brief, eventful career before she was wrecked in 1803.

Origins and capture
Mars was one of the many corvettes built in Bordeaux for privateer warfare. She was commissioned circa 1798 under Captain Estrenne. Though pierced for 24 cannon, she carried 22.

Mars captured Active, Clark, master, on 17 February 1800. Active had been sailing from Chepstow to Portsmouth. On 4 March   recaptured Active. After her recapture Active came into Bearhaven.

On 11 March Mars captured the merchant ship  as Perseverance was sailing from Baltimore to London. However, HMS Nereide recaptured Perseverance and sent her into Plymouth. Nereide had recaptured the American ship Perseverance, of Baltimore, on 3 March. She was carrying a cargo valued at £30,000.

Mars was armed with twenty 12-pounder guns and two 36-pounder carronades, and carried a crew of 180 men. She had taken several prizes and was returning to port when Nymphe captured her. Captain John Cooke described Mars as being "one of the finest Privateers fitted out of Bourdeaux."

Career
Garland was commissioned in September 1800 under the command of Commander John Acworth Ommanney. This was a temporary appointment that Earl Spencer arranged for him while he was convalescing from an illness. On 16 October Spencer sent Ommanney a commission as post captain. Captain Robert Honyman replaced Ommanney that month, for the Channel.

Also, on 6 April, Garland brought into Portsmouth a French brig with a cargo of wheat. 

Then on 21 June Honyman and Garland conveyed Admiral Robert Montague to Jamaica. Garland was also acting as escort to a group of merchantmen bound for the West indies,  among them.

Captain James Carhew replaced Honyman on Garland.

His replacement, in May 1803 or so, was Captain Frederick Cotterell.

Loss
On 10 November 1803, Garland was cruising with a squadron off the northern coast of Santo Domingo. Sent to investigate a strange sail, she made little headway in the light winds. Towards evening, a current caught her close to shore and she grounded on the Caracole reef off Cap François. Despite efforts to lighten her, she took on water and fell on her side. The other vessels of the squadron came to her aid and took off her crew and such stores and provisions as could be saved. On 11 November, the day after she grounded, her crew set her on fire, which destroyed her.

Citations

References
 
 
Marshall, John ( 1823-1835) Royal Naval Biography, or, Memoirs of the services of all the flag-officers, superannuated rear-admirals, retired-captains, post-captains, and commanders, whose names appeared on the Admiralty list of sea officers at the commencement of the present year 1823, or who have since been promoted ... (London: Longman, Hurst, Rees, Orme and Brown).
  

1798 ships
Post ships of the Royal Navy
Maritime incidents in 1803
Captured ships
Privateer ships of France
Shipwrecks in the Atlantic Ocean